Komló is a district in northern part of Baranya County. Komló is also the name of the town where the district seat is found. The district is located in the Southern Transdanubia Statistical Region.

Geography 
Komló District borders with Bonyhád District (Tolna County) to the east, Pécs District to the south, Hegyhát District to the west and north. The number of the inhabited places in Komló District is 20.

Municipalities 
The district has 1 town, 1 large village and 18 villages.
(ordered by population, as of 1 January 2012)

The bolded municipality is city, italics municipality is large village.

See also
List of cities and towns in Hungary

References

External links
 Postal codes of the Komló District

Districts in Baranya County